RAF Fayid (LG-211) is a former military airfield in Egypt, approximately  south of Ismailia (Al Isma`iliyah) and  northeast of Cairo.  It was formerly a major Royal Air Force airfield  built before World War II, and later used by the Egyptian Air Force.

History

During World War II, it was used as a military airfield by the Royal Air Force and the United States Army Air Forces during the North African Campaign against Axis forces.

Fayid was also the site of Camp Fayed, a significant internment camp of Italian Egyptians managed by the British authorities.

USAAF Ninth Air Force units which used the airfield were:

 98th Bombardment Group, 11 November 1942 – 9 February 1943 B-24 Liberator
 316th Troop Carrier Group, January–May 1943. C-47 Skytrain

After the immediate postwar rundown of RAF units in the Mediterranean, RAF Fayid became the home of No. 13 Squadron RAF flying Mosquitos. Later it was joined by No. 39 Squadron RAF, with night fighter Mosquitos, and No. 208 Squadron RAF with fighter-reconnaissance Spitfire XVIIIs. By 1952 it was the main transport staging post in the Canal Zone and also had five Valetta (MRT) Squadrons inc. 70, 78, 114 and 216. Along with the other RAF stations in Egypt, it was evacuated by April 1956.

Fayid was then used by the Egyptian Air Force until the 1980s and the EAF units and personnel moved to the new USAF built Fayid Air Base, located about 3 km south to accommodate the most recent sale of F-16 aircraft to Egypt by the U.S. Transatlantic Programs Center (TAC). The new Fayid Air Base now accommodates the 86th and 88th Tactical Fighter Squadrons of the 282nd Tactical Fighter Wing, flying F-16C/D Block 40s.

It was closed when the EAF moved out.  Today, the airfield is abandoned with sand reclaiming the facility back to the desert.

See also
 List of World War II North Africa Airfields

Notes

References

 Maurer, Maurer. Air Force Combat Units of World War II. Maxwell AFB, Alabama: Office of Air Force History, 1983. .
 
 Royal Air Force Airfield Creation for the Western Desert Campaign

Royal Air Force stations in Egypt
Royal Air Force stations of World War II in Egypt
Airfields of the United States Army Air Forces in Egypt
Egyptian Air Force bases
Defunct airports in Egypt